Liberation Army of Chameria (LAC, UÇÇ) is a reported paramilitary formation in the northwestern Greek region of Epirus.

In 2001, a video was released on the internet showing concealed members of the UCC, the leader "Mehmeti" said that the Liberation Army would form in southern Albania, to defend the ethnic Albanians who had "no rights": "circa 1 million Albanians in Northwestern Greece - Chameria, live without any rights, the UCC will be their legitimate representative."

When U.S. President George W. Bush visited Tirana on June 10, 2007, a delegation of the UCC on delivered a letter with nationalist requests. UCC delegations delivered letters to the U.S. embassies in Rome and Tirana.

In 2001, the Greek police reported that the group consisted of approximately 30-40 Albanians. It does not have the official support of the Albanian government.

See also
 Albanian nationalism
 Greater Albania
 Kosovo Liberation Army
 National Liberation Army of Macedonia
 Albanian National Army
 Northern Epirus Liberation Front

References

External links
Media Monitors - More signs NATO is behind ethnic Albanian attacks on Macedonia

Albanian militant groups
Albanian separatism
Paramilitary organizations based in Greece

Chameria